The Davis Conference Center is a 110,000-square-foot convention/conference center with over 70,000-square-feet of flexible meeting space located in Layton, Utah, United States. After several failed attempts, the center opened its doors in 2004. The $11.3 million center was a joint effort financed and developed by Davis County, Layton city, and a group of developers led by Kevin Garn. “The center, which hosts 700 groups a year, is unique in that it offers exhibit space, conference space and an adjoining hotel for lodging,” according to Dave Hilliard, the director of operations for the Davis Conference Center. In the conference's first year it hosted 726 events.  The conference center is attached to a Hilton Garden Inn, owned by Kevin Garn, and within walking distance to several hotels, the Layton Hills Mall, and restaurants. The Davis Conference Center features event spaces of different sizes, the biggest of which is a 12,500-square-foot ballroom with a 1,000 person capacity.

Two 85-foot-tall towers are mounted with LED light strips that indicate future weather forecasts. The Davis Conference Center is adorned with red rock from India, even though Utah is famous for its own red rock formations, but less expensive to purchase overseas saving tax payer dollars.

References

External links 

2004 establishments in Utah
Commercial buildings in Utah
Convention centers in Utah